Juan Carlos Martín Martínez (born 17 February 1967) is a Spanish racing cyclist. He rode in the 1992 Tour de France.

References

External links
 

1967 births
Living people
Spanish male cyclists
Place of birth missing (living people)
Sportspeople from the Province of Guadalajara
Cyclists from Castilla-La Mancha